Charadra cakulha is a moth of the family Noctuidae. It is known only from two specimens of the type series, collected in mid-June at San Cristobal de las Casas, Chiapas, Mexico.

The length of the forewings is 19.7 mm for males.

Etymology
A deity from Mayan mythology, Cakulha is the ruler of the lesser lightning bolts, and brother of Coyopa. It is a noun in apposition.

External links
The North American species of Charadra Walker, with a revision of the Charadra pata (Druce) group (Noctuidae, Pantheinae)

Pantheinae
Moths described in 2010